The Young Communists (Italian: Giovani Comuniste e Comunisti) is the youth organization of the Communist Refoundation Party (Italian: Partito della Rifondazione Comunista) and had more than 20,000 members.

Although the party was founded in 1991 (following the dissolution of the Italian Communist Party, and its youth section, the FGCI), the young members of the party did not have a stable organization until the middle of 1994, when Marco Rizzo created the Giovani Comunisti.

The first National Assembly took place in Chianciano in February 1996. In December 1997 the first National Convention of the GC took place. On this occasion two documents were presented. The party majority won with its own document gaining 67.8% of the vote. From the 4th to 7 July 2002 the second National Convention took place in Marina di Massa.

The third National Convention is scheduled for July 2006 in Bari.

Since its formation in 1994 the GC have become a growing part of the Italian left movement, and since the G8 summit in Genova (2001) the organization has become a major player in Italian youth politics.

The Giovani Comunisti on a worldwide platform are affiliated to the World Federation of Democratic Youth.

During the V National Conference Claudia Candeloro and Andrea Ferroni were elected as chairpersons.

During the VI National Conference Andrea Ferroni was elected as chairperson.

National committee 
 Andrea Ferroni – chairperson
 Antimo Caro Esposito – organization officer
 Clarissa Castaldi – communication officer
 Vincenzo Colaprice – website and international officer
 Nicola Comanzo – mutualism officer
 Lorenzo Falistocco – school and university officer
 Stefano Vento – movements officer

See also
Youth Federation of Italian Communists
Italian Communist Youth Federation

External links
Giovani Comuniste e Comunisti website

Communist Refoundation Party
Youth wings of political parties in Italy
Youth wings of communist parties
Youth wings of Party of the European Left member parties